Zachary Taylor McAllister (born December 8, 1987) is an American professional baseball pitcher in the Arizona Diamondbacks organization. He previously played in Major League Baseball (MLB) for the Cleveland Indians and the Detroit Tigers. He was drafted out of high school by the New York Yankees in 2006. After several seasons in the Yankees minor league system, he was traded to the Indians in 2010. McAllister made his major league debut in July 2011 and earned his first major league win in May 2012.

High school career 
In high school, McAllister played soccer, football, basketball and baseball for Illinois Valley Central High School in Chillicothe, Illinois.

In basketball, McAllister was the starting center for IVC during his senior season. He helped lead the Ghosts to their first and only IHSA Class A boys basketball state finals. IVC lost to Seneca, 47–44 in the state championship game on March 11, 2006. He scored 10 points and grabbed six rebounds in the state title game. McAllister averaged 16.8 points and 7.9 rebounds on 61 percent (205–335) shooting from the field and 71 percent accuracy on free throws for the season. The 6-foot-5 center was named Peoria Journal Star first-team All-Area, honorable mention all-state with The Associated Press, third-team Illinois Basketball Coaches Association and first-team all-Mid-Illini Conference.

Three months later, McAllister helped guide the Grey Ghosts to the Class A baseball state finals – for the first time in program history. IVC beat Trenton Wesclin, 8–3, to win the 2006 A state championship on June 3, 2006. He pitched 1/3 inning of relief in the title game – hitting a batter and giving up an RBI single before striking out the final batter to secure the win. IVC finished the season with a 40–2 record and ranked No. 40 in the final 2006 Baseball America High School Top 50 rankings.

McAllister finished his senior season with a 12–1 record, sporting a 1.04 ERA, 116 strikeouts and 13 walks. He also hit .486 with 13 doubles, six home runs and 38 RBIs. He was named the 2006 Peoria Journal Star Baseball Player of the Year along with first-team all-state honors from Illinois Prep Baseball Report, Chicago Tribune and Illinois High School Baseball Coaches Association.

McAllister was named Gatorade Illinois Baseball Player of the Year for 2005–2006.

Professional career

New York Yankees
McAllister was drafted by the New York Yankees in the third round of the 2006 Major League Baseball Draft out of Illinois Valley Central High School. He went 5–2 with a 3.09 ERA in 11 appearances during the 2006 season for the Yankees' Gulf Coast League squad. In 2007, McAllister was in Short Season-A State Island. He posted a 4–6 record with a 5.17 ERA and 75 strikeouts in 71.1 innings.

McAllister was ranked the Yankees' sixth best prospect prior to the 2009 season, according to Baseball America, and their fifth best prospect prior to the 2010 season.  He was named the Yankees' Minor League Pitcher of the Year in 2009 for his performance with the Double-A Trenton Thunder. However, he struggled in 2010 with the Triple-A Scranton/Wilkes-Barre Yankees.

At the 2010 MLB trade deadline, the Yankees and Seattle Mariners almost completed a deal that would have sent McAllister, Jesús Montero, and David Adams to the Seattle Mariners for Cliff Lee. When the teams shared medical reports, the Mariners determined that Adams' ankle was broken, not sprained. As a result, they chose to trade Lee to the Texas Rangers in a package centered on Justin Smoak.

Cleveland Indians
On August 20, he was revealed to be the player to be named later in the July 30 trade between the Yankees and Cleveland Indians for Austin Kearns. After the 2010 season, McAllister was added to the Indians' 40-man roster to protect him from the Rule 5 draft.

After teammate Fausto Carmona was sent to the disabled list, McAllister was activated and made his major league debut against the Toronto Blue Jays on July 7, 2011 at Progressive Field in Cleveland. McAllister earned his first MLB victory on May 7, 2012 against the Chicago White Sox.

In a May 13, 2012 road game against the Boston Red Sox, McAllister started in place of injured pitcher Josh Tomlin and recorded a career-high 8 strikeouts in a 4–1 loss. McAllister pitched 7 innings and gave up 4 runs on 8 hits. McAllister recorded the shortest outing of his career on August 6, pitching 1.2 innings. He gave up 9 runs, 2 earned.

He was designated for assignment on August 1, 2014, and optioned to the Triple-A Columbus Clippers on August 3. In 2015, he had an ERA of 3 in 61 appearances. He was 4–4 in 69 innings.

At the end of the 2016 regular season, McAllister finished with a 3.44 ERA and would be added to the postseason roster as the Indians clinched its first Central division title since 2007. On October 17, 2016, McAllister made his first postseason debut as the fourth pitcher of Game 3 of the ALCS against the Blue Jays. He faced three batters before giving up one run, before being pulled in favor of Bryan Shaw. During Game 2 of the World Series, McAllister made his second postseason appearance relieving Trevor Bauer. McAllister pitched through the fifth inning with two strikeouts before issuing a walk and two earned runs.

In 2017, McAllister appeared in 50 games, posting a 2–2 record, striking out 66 batters, walking 21, while posting a 1.19 WHIP and a 2.61 ERA. He recorded his 500th career MLB strikeout on Sept. 11, 2017 as the Indians captured their 19th win in a row. McAllister avoided arbitration with the Tribe on Jan. 12, 2018 by agreeing to a one-year deal valued at $2.45 million. McAllister was designated for assignment by the Indians on August 3, 2018, and, after clearing waivers, was released on August 7.

Detroit Tigers
On August 10, 2018, McAllister signed a major league contract with the Detroit Tigers. Eight days later, McAllister was designated for assignment by the Tigers after playing in three games and giving up eight runs. On August 21, 2018, McAllister elected free agency after clearing waivers.

Los Angeles Dodgers
On August 27, 2018, the Los Angeles Dodgers signed McAllister to a minor league contract and assigned him to the Triple-A Oklahoma City Dodgers. He appeared in five games, pitching six innings and allowing six earned runs.

Texas Rangers
On January 22, 2019, McAllister signed a one-year contract with the Texas Rangers. However, on March 25, 2019, the Rangers released McAllister.

Second Stint with Dodgers
On April 4, 2019, McAllister signed a minor league contract with the Los Angeles Dodgers organization. He was invited to Spring Training with the Dodgers for the 2020 season. In April 2020, McAllister was playing catch with fellow professional pitcher Pat Venditte, when he felt his arm snap. He was later diagnosed with a fractured right humerus and underwent surgery. He became a free agent on November 2, 2020.

Philadelphia Phillies
On August 10, 2021, McAllister signed a minor league deal with the Philadelphia Phillies organization.
McAllister made 11 appearances, split between the Rookie-League FCL Phillies and Triple-A Lehigh Valley IronPigs. He pitched to a 1-1 record with a 4.22 ERA and 10 strikeouts. On September 22, 2021, McAllister was released by the Phillies.

St. Louis Cardinals
On March 15, 2022, McAllister signed a minor league contract with the St. Louis Cardinals. He elected free agency on November 10, 2022.

Arizona Diamondbacks
On December 15, 2022, McAllister signed a minor league deal with the Arizona Diamondbacks.

Pitching style
From 2010 to 2014, McAllister threw a four-seam and two-seam fastball in the low 90s, a cut fastball in the mid-high 80s, a changeup averaging about 80, and a curveball in the high 70s. Some sources also list him as throwing a slider. Since being converted into a reliever in 2015, McAllister now relies on 3 pitches only.

Personal life 
McAllister hosted the inaugural Zach McAllister Baseball Camp on January 16, 2017 in Peoria, Illinois. All proceeds from the camp benefited St. Jude Children’s Research Hospital and Advocates for Access. He also held a silent auction dinner in collaboration with the baseball camp. A few items in the auction were Ben Zobrist's autographed and game-worn cleats and batting gloves, a Shaun Livingston autographed jersey, and a baseball bat signed by  Jim Thome. McAllister also auctioned off a pair of autographed game-worn cleats as well as one of his World Series jerseys. A check presentation to Advocates for Access from McAllister for $7,500 occurred on August 10, 2017.

In his second year hosting the Zach McAllister Baseball Camp, McAllister raised over $40,000 for Advocates for Access on January 15, 2018. The camp featured 105 campers – 3rd through 8th graders. He once again hosted a silent auction dinner the night before the baseball camp. There close to 200 people in attendance. Silent auction items included autographed jerseys from soon-to-be Hall of Famer Jim Thome, Clayton Kershaw, and Derek Jeter.

McAllister's father, Steve played college baseball at Bradley University and was drafted by the Houston Astros in the 5th round of the 1981 Major League Baseball draft. He played in the minor league systems of the Astros and Pittsburgh Pirates from 1981–1986. He is currently a scout for the Arizona Diamondbacks.

Zach is married to Kamerin McAllister. The two met in Peoria, IL where they both are from.

References

External links

1987 births
Living people
People from Chillicothe, Illinois
Baseball players from Illinois
Major League Baseball pitchers
Cleveland Indians players
Detroit Tigers players
Gulf Coast Yankees players
Staten Island Yankees players
Tampa Yankees players
Charleston RiverDogs players
Trenton Thunder players
Scranton/Wilkes-Barre Yankees players
Columbus Clippers players
Akron Aeros players
Lake County Captains players
Akron RubberDucks players
Oklahoma City Dodgers players